Philip McCallion is an American social worker and scholar, currently a Distinguished Professor at University at Albany, State University of New York, and also a published author.

References

Year of birth missing (living people)
Living people
State University of New York faculty
American social workers
University at Albany, SUNY alumni
University at Albany, SUNY faculty